Jan Gabrielsz. Sonjé (1625, Delft – 1707, Rotterdam), was a Dutch Golden Age landscape painter.

Biography
According to the RKD he was a pupil of Adam Pijnacker. He became a member of the Delft Guild of St. Luke in 1646, but moved some time after that to Rotterdam, where he was headman of the Rotterdam guild in 1678, 1686 and 1692. He is known for Italianate landscapes and influenced the painters Gerrit Maes and Pieter van Asch. Gerrit's brother Pieter van Mase sometimes painted figures in his landscapes.

References

Jan Gabrielsz. Sonjé on Artnet

1625 births
1707 deaths
Dutch Golden Age painters
Dutch male painters
Artists from Delft
Painters from Delft
Painters from Rotterdam